The Murder of Diana Devon and Other Mysteries is a collection of mystery stories and radio plays by the British thriller writer Michael Gilbert, first published in 2009 by the British company Robert Hale and unpublished in the United States. Gilbert, who was appointed CBE in 1980, was a founder-member of the British Crime Writers' Association. The Mystery Writers of America named him a Grand Master in 1988 and in 1990 he was presented Bouchercon's Lifetime Achievement Award. It contains 13 previously uncollected stories, as well as a poem and two unpublished radio plays featuring his characters Mr. Calder and Mr. Behrens. It has an introduction by John Cooper and an appendix listing all of the Calder and Behrens radio plays. At least two of the stories feature Superintendent Mahood, one of Gilbert's earlier recurring characters and who only appears in short stories.

Stories in order
Introduction, page 7, by John Cooper
The Murder of Diana Devon, page 13, Superintendent Mahood
The Rules of the Game, page 42
Good Old Monty, page 58
No Place Like Home, page 72
St Ethelburga and the Angel of Death, page 77, radio play featuring Mr. Calder and Mr. Behrens
The Great German Spy Hunt, page 106
The Killing of Karl Carver, page 112
Close Contact, page 123
The Fire-Raisers, page 127
Y Mynyddoed Sanctiaidd, page 145
The Klagenfurt Tote, page 153
Churchill's Men, page 159, radio play featuring Mr. Calder and Mr. Behrens
Coronation Year, page 186
The Seventh Paragraph, page 197
Superintendent Mahood and the Craven Case, page 201, Superintendent Mahood
Arnold or the Uses of Electricity, page 219, poem
Appendix, page 223 — Game Without Rules, a series in twenty parts

Notes

External links

2009 short story collections
Robert Hale books
Mystery short story collections
British short story collections
Short story collections by Michael Gilbert